Herold is a brand of beer made in Herold Březnice Castle Brewery, a small brewery in Březnice, a town 60 kilometres south of Prague, Czech Republic.

History
Beer was first noted to have been commercially brewed here in 1506. Its age puts it firmly towards the top the list of world's oldest-established companies

Following World War II, the brewery was taken over by the government and became part of the state-owned Institute for Brewing and Malt Production. Pivovar Herold Březnice is now once more operating under private ownership for the first time since 1945.

In 2008 the brewery was once again under Czech control when Ballena a.s. bought out the American owners, the new owners also resurrected Herold Weizen.

External links

Herold Brewery
Herold Under New Ownership
Return of Herold Wheat Lager

Beer in the Czech Republic